Hindhukolheh is an upcoming Maldivian film written by Ahmed Tholah and directed by Ali Shifau. Produced by Mohamed Ali and Aishath Fuad Thaufeeq under Dark Rain Entertainment, the film stars Sharaf Abdulla and Aminath Rashfa in pivotal roles.

Premise
The film narrates the story of love and self-discovery, where Kiara, unsure about her feelings for her married boss, loses her recent memory on a work trip. Imran, hopelessly in love with her, helps her through recovery by acting as her boyfriend and fulfilling her long-held wishes, hoping she will remember her true feelings when her memory returns. The story explores how Kiara rediscovers herself and what she truly wants in life, while Imran hopes to finally win the love he has always dreamt of.

Cast 
 Sharaf Abdulla as Imran
 Aminath Rashfa as Kiara
 Ravee Farooq as Shaad
 Mariyam Majudha
 Ahmed Shakir
 Kate Gale
 Shaana Saeed
 Mohamed Rifshan
 Aminath Shamraa
 Mohamed Afrah

Development
The project was announced in March 2022, where it was announced that eighty percent of filming was completed from Dark Rain Entertainment's new romantic feature film titled Hindhukolheh. Filming was completed in April 2022.

On 16 September 2022, Dark Rain Entertainment released a cover version of the Maldivian iconic song "Lolakah Ninjeh Naadhey", penned by Easa Shareef and originally performed by Ali Rameez for the album Goyye (1999). Upon release, Rameez claimed the copyrights of the song on YouTube and criticised the production company for using his original work without his permission. Soon after, Dark Rain Entertainment personally and publicly apologized Rameez and announced that the song will not be used in any of their productions.

Soundtrack

Release
The film was initially slated for a theatrical release, however, considering the demand of Olympus Cinema after its re-opening on 4 February 2023, Dark Rain Entertainment decided to premiere the fil on Medianet Multi Screen.

References

2023 films
Maldivian romantic drama films